Lewis Davey (born 24 October 2000) is a British athlete who competes in the 400 metres.

Personal life
Davey attended The Priory Ruskin Academy in Lincolnshire.

Career
As a young athlete Davey would compete as a decathlete. By 2021, Davey was a member of the British 4x400m relay squad at the 2021 European Athletics U23 Championships.

He was a member of the British relay team that ran in the 2022 European Athletics Championships – Men's 4 × 400 metres relay, winning gold in Munich.

References

External Links

 2000 births
Living people
British male sprinters
English male sprinters
20th-century British people
21st-century British people
European Athletics Championships winners